Omar Salah   is an Egyptian footballer who plays for Egyptian Premier League side Smouha as a goalkeeper.

Honours

Club

Zamalek SC
 Egypt Cup: 2017–18
 Saudi-Egyptian Super Cup: 2018
 CAF Confederation Cup : 2018–19

Egypt
Africa U-23 Cup of Nations Champions: 2019

References

External links
 

1998 births
Living people
Egyptian footballers
Zamalek SC players
Association football goalkeepers